Bălaia may refer to several villages in Romania:

 Bălaia, a village in Filipeni Commune, Bacău County
 Bălaia, a village in Tileagd Commune, Bihor County
 Bălaia, a village in Smeeni Commune, Buzău County

See also:
 Balaia (Raven), a fictional country in the Chronicles of the Raven by James Barclay